Acherdoa is a genus of moths of the family Noctuidae.

Species
 Acherdoa ferraria Walker, 1865
 Acherdoa ornata

References
 Acherdoa at Markku Savela's Lepidoptera and Some Other Life Forms
 Natural History Museum Lepidoptera genus database

Hadeninae
Noctuoidea genera